Raorchestes nerostagona is a species of frog in the family Rhacophoridae. It is endemic to the Western Ghats, India. It has been called as the Kalpetta yellow bush frog or lichen bush frog for its patchy lichen like patterning that make it cryptic. First described in 2005 based on a specimen obtained in Kalpetta, the species has subsequently been found in many parts of the Western Ghats.

Taxonomy

The species was originally described in the genus Philautus but has since been moved into the genus Raorchestes. The species name is derived from Greek nero for water and stagona for drop and refers to the call of the frog which is emitted from high up in the trees and resembles the sound of a raindrop falling into water. Like all other members of this genus, eggs are thought to develop into little froglets entirely within the egg-shell, although this direct development pattern was not directly observed in the species at the time of its description.

Description

This species is distinguished from others in the genus by the presence of webbing between all the fingers and fully webbed toes as well. A fringe of skin is found along the outer edge of the fore and hind limbs. The tongue has a pointed papilla. The snout to vent length varies from about 3 to 3.5 cm and the colouration makes it cryptic among lichen and moss patches on tree trunks. The skin has projections making it appear rough.

The species was described as being widely distributed in the Wayanad region between Mananthavady, Sultan Battery, and Kalpetta where its call could be heard easily during the rainy season. The calls made from high in the tree canopy consist of a high-pitched "pluck" sounding like a rain-drop falling into a bucket of water repeating about every 3 to 4 seconds. Its natural habitat is in the forest canopy of tropical moist montane forests. It is threatened by habitat loss.

References

External links

 

nerostagona
Frogs of India
Endemic fauna of the Western Ghats
Wayanad district
Taxonomy articles created by Polbot
Amphibians described in 2005